KFTI (1070 AM) is a radio station broadcasting a classic country music format. Licensed to Wichita, Kansas, United States, the station serves the Wichita area. The station is owned by SummitMedia.

KFTI is one of oldest stations in Kansas, dating to 1923, when it was founded as KFKB in Milford by the notorious "goat gland doctor", J. R. Brinkley.

History

Establishment in Milford as KFKB

The station was first licensed, as KFKB, on September 20, 1923 to the Brinkley-Jones Hospital Association in the small town of Milford, Kansas, transmitting on 1050 kHz. The call letters were randomly assigned from an alphabetical roster of available call signs, with the slogans of "Kansas Folks Know Best" and "Kansas First, Kansas Best" later adopted based on the call sign.

John R. Brinkley was the dominant force for both the hospital and for KFKB. He became interested in the potential of radio broadcasting soon after its introduction in the early 1920s. Brinkley was promoting a "goat gland" transplant operation, claimed to revive men's failing libidos. During a medical trip to California, he was impressed by a visit to the Los Angeles Times radio station, KHJ. After its introduction, KFKB was used to promote the hospital and a line of pharmaceutical products, and profits from these two sources provided funds that financed an ambitious range of programming. During 1923 and 1924 the station also carried remote broadcasts originating from the state college campus at Manhattan.

KFKB was deleted on June 3, 1925, then relicensed on October 23, 1926, again as KFKB, now assigned to J. R. Brinkley, M. D. KFKB's revival occurred during a period when the U.S. government had temporarily lost its authority to assign transmitting frequencies. At the end of 1926 the station was reported broadcasting on a non-standard frequency of 695 kHz.

Following the formation of the Federal Radio Commission (FRC) in early 1927, KFKB was assigned to 1370 kHz on May 3, 1927, which was changed to 1240 kHz the next month. On November 11, 1928, under the provisions of the FRC's General Order 40, KFKB was assigned to 1130 kHz. However, in February 1929, the station was reassigned to 1050 kHz on a "limited time" basis, required to sign off as of sunset in Los Angeles, in order to limit interference to the frequency's dominant "clear channel" occupant located there, KNX.

In late 1929, Radio Digest magazine reported that: "The slogan of KFKB, 'The Sunshine Station in the Heart of the Nation', was contributed by a little shut-in, a poor crippled girl, who said that it was the friendly attitude of the station, and the good cheer brought to the homes of those who are forever crippled made her think that the station was a beacon of sunshine, and since the station is located within 12 miles of the geographical center of the United States, the 'heart of the nation' was appropriate." A few months later, the magazine proclaimed that, as a result of a contest it had held, KFKB was the "World's Most Popular Station".

Despite KFKB's popularity, Brinkley's controversial medical practices brought scrutiny from both the medical profession and the Federal Radio Commission, which began a review whether the station's license should be renewed. Brinkley claimed that silencing his radio station would amount to prohibited government censorship. However, after three days of hearings in May 1930, the commission voted not to renew KFKB's operating authority. Of particular concern was Brinkley's daily "Medical Question Box" programs. The commissioners concluded "that the practice of a physician's prescribing treatment for a patient whom he has never seen, and bases his diagnosis upon what symptoms may be recited by the patient in a letter addressed to him, is inimical to the public health and safety, and for that reason is not in the public interest". 

KFKB was allowed to remain on the air while this ruling was being appealed through the courts. Brinkley used its airtime in an unsuccessful effort to be elected governor of Kansas in November 1930 via a write-in campaign. Finally, on February 2, 1931, the Court of Appeals of District of Columbia upheld the FRC's ruling denying the station's license renewal. Brinkley responded by establishing the first high-powered "border blaster" station, XER in Villa Acuña, Mexico, located just south of the U.S. border, with programming primarily aimed at an American audience.

Acquisition by the Farmers and Bankers Life Insurance Company

On February 20, 1931, the Farmers and Bankers Life Insurance Company was authorized to take over station operations, and the call sign was changed to KFBI on May 1, 1931. In 1932, studios were moved to Abilene, Kansas, although the transmitter site remained in Milford. 

 In early 1940, KFBI relocated both its transmitter site and studios to Wichita. This move included the installation of a directional antenna with a strong null to the west, to be used at night, which eliminated the limitation that had previously restricted KFBI's hours of operation due to the need to protect KNX's nighttime signal. On March 29, 1941, as part of the implementation of the North American Regional Broadcasting Agreement, stations on 1050 kHz, including KFBI, moved to 1070 kHz.

In 1958 Hollywood actors Mary Pickford and Charles "Buddy" Rogers bought the station for $450,000. Early in her career Pickford was known as the "Girl With the Golden Curls", and the call letters were changed to the phonetically similar KIRL in 1960. Two years later KIRL was sold to Bernice L. and F. F. (Mike) Lynch for $400,000, who renamed the station to KFDI after the Federal Bureau of Investigation objected to the station returning to "KFBI". On August 30, 1999, KFDI changed to a classic country format, moving current and recurrent music to KFDI-FM.

On April 3, 2001, the call letters were changed to KFTI. On May 27, 2010, at 12:30 p.m., after nearly 50 years of country music programming, the station changed call letters to KLIO and switched to oldies programming, airing music from the late 1950s through the early 1980s, with an emphasis on mid-'60s through mid-'70s. The station was an affiliate of Scott Shannon's True Oldies Channel, and also aired period American Top 40 with Casey Kasem programs.

At midnight on September 30, 2013, KLIO switched from "True Oldies" to ESPN Deportes programming. Journal Communications and the E. W. Scripps Company announced on July 30, 2014 that the two companies were merging, creating a new broadcast company under the E. W. Scripps Company name that would own their combined broadcast properties, including KLIO. The transaction was slated to be completed in 2015, pending shareholder and regulatory approvals.

At midnight on October 22, 2014, KLIO switched from "ESPN Deportes" back to Classic Country, now simulcasting KFTI-FM, which Journal Communications was selling to Envision, a non-profit low vision advocacy group, in order to meet ownership requirements, as the Scripps buyout nullified the grandfathered ownership clause Journal had. The format and KFTI call letters were restored after a 4½-year absence. The simulcast lasted until the sale of KFTI-FM was approved on December 12, 2014.

Scripps exited radio in 2018 and the Wichita stations went to SummitMedia in a four-market, $47 million deal completed on November 1, 2018.

References

External links

FCC History Cards for KFTI (covering 1927-1980 as KFKB / KFBI / KIRL / KFDI) 

FTI
Classic country radio stations in the United States
Radio stations established in 1923
1923 establishments in Kansas